Dragoljub Bursać is a retired Serbian football player.

Biography
Born in Nakovo, Bursać started his career in his local club Polet. In 1975, he moved to Proleter Zrenjanin in the Yugoslav Second League, where he played for three seasons. In 1978, he moved to Rijeka in the Yugoslav First League and was part of the Rijeka team that won the 1978–79 Yugoslav Cup. He scored the winning goal in the 2–1 win in the first leg of the Cup Final against Partizan on 16 May 1979. In the following season, he was a regular in Rijeka's team that went on to reach the Quarter-finals of the 1979–80 European Cup Winners' Cup, where they were eliminated by Juventus. Following three seasons with Rijeka, prior to retiring, Bursać played with Sutjeska Nikšić, OFK Beograd and OFK Kikinda in the Yugoslav Second League.

References

Living people
Yugoslav footballers
Serbian footballers
Association football midfielders
FK Proleter Zrenjanin players
HNK Rijeka players
FK Sutjeska Nikšić players
OFK Beograd players
OFK Kikinda players
Yugoslav First League players
Year of birth missing (living people)